XIX Entertainment is an entertainment content and intellectual rights organisation based in North America and Europe. The company, which has been valued at $100 million
was set up by Simon Fuller in 2010 to commercially develop world class individuals and entertainment properties. The company owns several high value partnerships in tech and media including an innovative 5G venture with Verizon, an international educational initiative with Pearson PLC, a new talent platform with TikTok parent company ByteDance as well as owning shareholdings in various other entertainment and fashion properties.

XIX Entertainment has a well established reputation for providing artist services that include management, television and music production, social media engagement, Public Relations, entertainment marketing, legal and accounting services, and has a staff of fifty with offices in London, New York, Los Angeles and Nashville.

The company manages or has managed Annie Lennox, Victoria Beckham, David Beckham, Andy Murray, Steven Tyler, Carrie Underwood, The Spice Girls, Aloe Blacc, Lisa Marie Presley and others.

References

Talent agencies
2010 establishments in California